is the 32nd single by Japanese entertainer Akina Nakamori (credited as "Akina"). Written by Nakamori, Takashi Kamisawatsu, and Masaki and produced by Brian Setzer, the single was released on November 1, 1995, by MCA Victor. This was the first single to be co-written by Nakamori. It was also the lead single from her compilation album True Album Akina 95 Best.

The single peaked at No. 32 on Oricon's weekly singles chart and sold over 35,700 copies. It was Nakamori's first single since her 1982 debut "Slow Motion" to miss the top-30, and her first single to sell under 50,000 copies.

Track listing 
All music is arranged by Brian Setzer.

Personnel 
 Brian Setzer – guitar
 Johnny Baz – bass
 Bill Bateman – drums

Charts

References

External links 
 
 

1995 singles
1995 songs
Akina Nakamori songs
Japanese-language songs
Universal Music Japan singles
MCA Records singles